The World Ninepin Bowling Association (WNBA) is the world governing body of nine-pin bowling, and one of two member associations of the International Bowling Federation. The WNBA counts approximately 250,000 members in 26 countries in Europe, the Americas and Asia.

Position within the IBF 
The WNBA holds the position of a disciplinary association and is thus an independent organ within the IBF. The WNBA is responsible for disseminating nine-pin bowling all over the world and to win further nations as WNBA’s members.

WNBA members

Presidency

See also 
 World Ninepin Bowling Classic Championships

External links 
 Internet site of the WNBA
 New website of the WNBA

Bowling organizations
Sports organizations established in 1973
1973 establishments in Austria
Organisations based in Vienna